Spergularia macrotheca is a species of flowering plant in the family Caryophyllaceae known by the common name sticky sandspurry. It is native to western North America from British Columbia to Baja California, where it grows in many types of moist coastal and inland habitat, often in alkaline and saline substrates. It may be found in marshes, alkali flats, beaches, meadows, seeps, and vernal pools. It is a perennial herb producing a narrow stem up to 40 centimeters long with a woody, thickened base and taproot. They may grow erect or prostrate across the ground. It is covered in sticky glandular hairs, especially in the inflorescence. The stems are lined with fleshy linear leaves, sometimes tipped with spines. The leaves are accompanied by triangular stipules up to a centimeter long each. Flowers occur in clusters at the end of the stem as well as in leaf axils. The small flowers have five pointed sepals and five oval white to lavender-pink petals. The fruit is a capsule containing tiny reddish brown, winged seeds.

References

External links
  Calflora Database: Spergularia macrotheca (Large flowered sand spurry,  Sticky sand spurry)
Jepson Manual Treatment
USDA Plants Profile
Flora of North America
Photo gallery

macrotheca
Flora of California
Flora of Baja California
Flora of British Columbia
Flora of Oregon
Natural history of the California chaparral and woodlands
Natural history of the Central Valley (California)
Natural history of the Channel Islands of California
Natural history of the Peninsular Ranges
Natural history of the San Francisco Bay Area
Flora without expected TNC conservation status